Chumphon Football Club (Thai สโมสรฟุตบอลจังหวัดชุมพร ) is a Thai professional football club based in Chumphon Province. They currently play in Thai League 4 Southern Region.

Timeline

History of events of Chumphon Football Club:

Stadium and locations

Season by season record

Player squad

External links 
 Official Website
 Official Facebookpage
 Fanpage

Football clubs in Thailand
Association football clubs established in 2009
Chumphon province
2009 establishments in Thailand